Coleophora albicostella is a moth of the family Coleophoridae. It is found from Latvia to the Iberian Peninsula, Italy, Greece and Cyprus.

The larvae feed on Fragaria vesca, Potentilla cinerea, Potentilla palustris and Potentilla tabaernaemontani. They create a yellowish white spatulate leaf case. It strongly compressed laterally and bivalved. Larvae can be found from autumn to May.

References

albicostella
Moths described in 1842
Moths of Europe